Hawkesbury (Windover Field) Airport, formerly , was located  west of Hawkesbury, Ontario, Canada. It was one of three small airports between Ottawa and Montreal.

See also
 List of airports in the Montreal area

References

Defunct airports in Ontario
Hawkesbury, Ontario